Kleva is a surname. Notable people with the surname include:

Amedeo Kleva (1923–1996), Italian footballer
Lucijan Kleva (1942–2009), Slovenian rower
Mojca Kleva (born 1976), Slovenian political scientist and politician

Slovene-language surnames